The blue wall is a term used in British politics to describe a set of parliamentary constituencies in southern England which have traditionally voted for the Conservative Party, but generally opposed Brexit and are seen as being potentially vulnerable to gains either by the Liberal Democrats or the Labour Party. This shift was noticeable in the UK general elections of 2017 (when Labour gained Canterbury, which had had a Conservative MP since 1918) and 2019 (when the Liberal Democrats made inroads in Esher and Walton).

Overview
The "Blue wall" is the inverse of the "red wall", a term coined in August 2019 to describe a set of constituencies in northern England, the Midlands and Wales that had long been held by Labour, and many of which were later gained by the Conservatives at the 2019 election. YouGov defines the blue wall as seats which are "currently held by the Conservatives; voted to Remain in 2016; and have a higher-than-average concentration of degree holders in the population (25%+)."

The term saw significant use following the 2021 Chesham and Amersham by-election, in which the Liberal Democrats overturned a large Conservative majority; Ed Davey, the Leader of the Liberal Democrats, knocked down a literal blue wall of bricks with an orange mallet to symbolise his party's victory. He said afterwards that he believed "the blue wall in the south can be taken by the Liberal Democrats in large numbers of constituencies." In July 2021, Davey started the process of selecting parliamentary candidates in blue wall seats and the party revealed its first candidate, for Guildford, the following month.

Starting in December 2021, with the 2021 North Shropshire by-election, the usage of this term has evolved to mean any seat which the Conservative Party has traditionally held. The evolved usage has been demonstrated by Davey describing the North Shropshire seat as being another seat falling from the blue wall.

In February 2022, think tank Onward posited that the north of England—as part of the red wall—would be "the principal battleground in the next general election" with there being "no evidence of a southern 'blue wall' ready to fall". The study found that only 20% of battleground seats at the next election would be in southern England, and in such seats the Conservatives could "gain ground". Onward's director Will Tanner said, "While the south is steadily becoming less Conservative over time, there is no blue wall waiting to fall across the Home Counties in two years' time". However, Onward did admit that certain seats "in London and the south-east are drifting away from the Tories and could fall in two or three elections' time", with data analyst James Blagden observing that "[t]he heart of the Tory party has been shifting northwards for the last 30 years" yet any potential of their "traditional southern heartlands slowly drifting away" existed in the long-term, with their "greatest short-term concern" being "backsliding in the red wall, losing their iconic 2019 gains, and putting their majority at serious risk."

Blue wall constituencies
The following constituencies, among others, are considered part of the blue wall.

Criticism of the term
Just like "red wall", the concept of a blue wall has been criticised as a generalisation. James Blagden, Chief Data Analyst at the think tank Onward, said there was no evidence of a blue wall in Southern England that mirrored Labour's red wall.

If a Blue Wall existed anywhere, it was London in the 1990s. The Conservatives polled better in London than they did nationally at every election between 1979 and 1992. But there was a 'correction waiting to happen'. Using regression analysis, we show that the Conservatives over-performed demographic predictions in 49 out of their 60 London seats in 1987. Only 11 of these remained after Tony Blair swept to victory ten years later. The pendulum swung hard against the Conservatives and has never returned. So much so that the Conservatives have never held a smaller share of London seats, while being in Government, than they do now.

Opinion polling

See also 
 Blue wall (U.S. politics)
 Red wall (British politics)

Notes

References 

Political terms in the United Kingdom
2019 United Kingdom general election
Electoral geography